The Roman Catholic Diocese of Riohacha is a diocese located in the city of Riohacha in the Ecclesiastical province of Barranquilla in Colombia.

History
 4 December 1952: Established as Apostolic Vicariate of Riohacha from the Apostolic Vicariate of Goajira
 16 July 1988: Promoted as Diocese of Riohacha

Bishops

Ordinaries
 Vicars Apostolic of Riohacha (Roman rite)
 Bishop Eusebio Septimio Mari, O.F.M. Cap. (1954.02.21 – 1965.12.21)
 Bishop Livio Reginaldo Fischione, O.F.M. Cap. (1966.09.29 – 1988.07.16)
 Bishops of Riohacha (Roman rite)
 Bishop Jairo Jaramillo Monsalve (1988.07.16 – 1995.06.10), appointed Bishop of Santa Rosa de Osos
 Bishop Gilberto Jiménez Narváez (1996.07.16 – 2001.03.08), resigned but was soon appointed auxiliary bishop of Medellín
 Bishop Armando Larios Jiménez (2001.03.08 – 2004.06.05)
 Bishop Héctor Ignacio Salah Zuleta (2005.05.13 – 2020.04.22)
 Bishop Francisco Antonio Ceballos Escobar, C.SS.R. (2020.04.22 -)

See also
Roman Catholicism in Colombia

Sources

External links
 Catholic Hierarchy
 GCatholic.org

Roman Catholic dioceses in Colombia
Roman Catholic Ecclesiastical Province of Barranquilla
Christian organizations established in 1952
Roman Catholic dioceses and prelatures established in the 20th century
1952 establishments in Colombia